The Canadian Payroll Association (CPA) represents employers' payroll interests.

Canada's 1.5 million employers annually pay $929 billion in wages and taxable benefits, $310 billion in federal and provincial statutory remittances, and $180 billion in health and retirement benefits, as well as produce 26 million T4s, 9 million T4As, and 7 million RL-1s - all while complying with over 200 regulatory requirements.

Background 

The CPA was founded in 1978 by a group of payroll practitioners who proposed changes to the first Record of Employment (ROE) form.  They advocate on behalf of employers to federal and provincial/territorial governments, proactively influencing payroll- and benefits-related legislation to enable all stakeholders to administer them in an efficient and effective manner.

Certification 
The CPA offers two Certifications.  Payroll Compliance Practitioner (PCP) and Certified Payroll Manager (CPM).  The required courses for each certification are:

Certification holders are required to:
 adhere to a Professional Code of Conduct;
 maintain membership with the CPA; and
 participate in continuing professional education (CPE).

Payroll courses are offered at over 50 post-secondary institutions and 90 campuses across Canada. The courses are also offered through an instructor led online program that starts every month.

Professional Development 

The CPA holds more than 400 professional development seminars across Canada each year to address key payroll topics ranging from Learning Payroll I and II which covers the basics, to Taxable Benefits and Year-end.

The CPA's Annual Conference & Trade Show, held in a different city each year, is a payroll networking event featuring more than 50 educational and keynote sessions. It also includes the largest payroll trade show in Canada.

National Payroll Week (NPW) is the largest annual public relations initiative of the Canadian Payroll Association. NPW recognizes the accomplishments of payroll professionals, the payroll community and The Canadian Payroll Association (CPA), by building greater awareness of the size and scope of payroll and its impact on business, government and employees across Canada.

References

External links 
 Canadian Payroll Association website
 Canada Revenue Agency's Payroll Information page

Payroll
Employment compensation
Employment in Canada
Payroll